Santa Clara de Olimar is a small town in Treinta y Tres Department in eastern Uruguay.

Geography

History
It was founded as "Olimar" by Decree of 7 March 1878. On 12 June 1911, it was declared a "Pueblo" (village) by the Act of Ley Nº 3.776. It was renamed to "Santa Clara de Olimar" and its status was elevated to "Villa" (town) on 21 August 1962 by the Act of Ley Nº 13.083.

Population
In 2011, Santa Clara de Olimar had a population of 2,341.
 
Source: Instituto Nacional de Estadística de Uruguay

Places of worship
 St. Clare of Assisi Parish Church (Roman Catholic)

References

External links
INE map of Santa Clara de Olimar

Populated places in the Treinta y Tres Department